Caroline de Souza Corrêa (born May 19, 1979) is a Brazilian actress.

Biography
Correa was born in Umuarama, Brazil. After a brief stint in London, she moved to Sydney, Australia at age 20, where she lived for five years. She then moved to Los Angeles, United States, where she pursued her acting career.

Career
Caroline made her first film debut in the Australian movie, Go Big, which starred Justine Clarke, Tom Long, Alex Dimitriades, and Kimberley Joseph. A year later, she appeared in Star Wars: Episode III – Revenge of the Sith, during the year she took a role as Henry's date in the film Stealth. In 2006, she starred in The Fast and the Furious: Tokyo Drift of film series. Correa has recently appeared on Redbelt, and is currently working on Deep in the Valley. She features on the Magnum ice-cream ad alongside Benicio Del Toro.

Personal life
On February 22, 2008, Caroline married the Arab photographer Aladdin Ishmael at a ceremony that took place in Florianópolis, Brazil.

Filmography

References

External links

1979 births
Living people
People from Umuarama
Brazilian television actresses
Brazilian film actresses
Brazilian stage actresses
Brazilian expatriates in the United States